Tucano may refer to:
 Tucano people, indigenous people of Brazil and Colombia
 The Tucano language of Brazil and Colombia, part of the Tucanoan family of languages
 Embraer EMB 312 Tucano, a Brazilian turboprop training aircraft
 Short Tucano – licence-built version for the Royal Air Force
 Embraer EMB 314 Super Tucano – upgraded version
 Flying Legend Tucano Replica, an Italian light-sport aircraft
 Flylab Tucano, an Italian ultralight aircraft
 The Portuguese name for the toucan
 A member or supporter of the Brazilian Social Democracy Party
 Tucano, Brazil, a municipality in the state of Bahia in the North-East region of Brazil.
 Tucanos, Restaurant, a growing Brazilian based restaurant in various locations of the United States.